The harmonic scale is a "super-just" musical scale allowing extended just intonation, beyond 5-limit to the 19th harmonic, and free modulation through the use of synthesizers. Transpositions and tuning tables are controlled by the left hand on the appropriate note on a one-octave keyboard.

For example, if the harmonic scale is tuned to a fundamental of C, then harmonics 16–32 are as follows:

Some harmonics are not included: 23, 25, 29, & 31. The 21st is a natural seventh above G, but not a great interval above C, and the 27th is a just fifth above D. 

It was invented by Wendy Carlos and used on three pieces on her album Beauty in the Beast (1986): Just Imaginings, That's Just It, and Yusae-Aisae. Versions of the scale have also been used by Ezra Sims, Franz Richter Herf and Gosheven.

Number of notes
Though described by Carlos as containing "144 [= 122] distinct pitches to the octave", the twelve scales include 78  notes per octave.

Technically there should then be duplicates and thus 57  pitches . For example, a perfect fifth above G (D) is the major tone above C.

References

External links
"Wendy Carlos Harmonic scale", Microtonal-Synthesis.com.

19-limit tuning and intervals
Chromaticism
Musical scales
Wendy Carlos